The Emirati leaf-toed gecko (Asaccus caudivolvulus) is a species of lizard in the family Phyllodactylidae. It is endemic to the United Arab Emirates.

References

Asaccus
Reptiles of the Arabian Peninsula
Endemic fauna of the United Arab Emirates
Reptiles described in 1994
Taxa named by Edwin Nicholas Arnold